Addi is a Tigrinya term meaning "village" derived from the Ge'ez word "Ad" meaning "son." The word can be found in many village and city names in Tigray Region, Ethiopia and Tigre and Tigrinya-speaking Eritrea.

See also
 Tigrinya grammar

Geography of Ethiopia
Geography of Eritrea